Jacob van der Borgh, (Latinized: Jacobus a Castro; 1560 – 1639) was the third bishop of Roermond, in the Netherlands.

Life
Jacobus a Castro was born in Amsterdam in 1560, the son of Gerard Pietersz. van der Borgh and Anna Janssen du Bois. He studied philosophy and theology at Leuven University. In 1579 he graduated in philosophy at the top of his year and was appointed a lecturer in Pig College (Pedagogie Het Varken). Among the students that he taught there were Jacobus Boonen, a later archbishop of Mechelen, and Petrus Peckius the Younger, a later Chancellor of Brabant.

Castro was appointed professor of theology in Leuven on 22 August 1594. In 1610 he was named to the see of Roermond, and consecrated bishop in 1611. He invited the Jesuits to establish their first presence in the city, giving them his own house for the purpose.

From 1632 to 1637 Roermond was occupied by the States and the cathedral was turned over to Protestant worship. Castro remained in the city, and risked his own life to tend the sick during the epidemics of 1634 and 1635.

He died in Roermond on 24 February 1639. A volume of 110 of his sermons was printed posthumously in 1649.

Writings
Regnum Christi, dat is het Rijck Christi, vervangen in hondert en tien stichtelijke en seer geleerde sermonen, achtergelaten, tot bezonderen troost van alle oprechte catholycke zielen en de grondelijcke wederlegginge tegen de opwerpselen van onse wederpartye int stuck van geloof (Roermond, 1649)

References

1560 births
1639 deaths
Clergy from Amsterdam
Bishops of Roermond
Old University of Leuven alumni
17th-century Roman Catholic bishops in the Holy Roman Empire